The Women's team event at the 2016 Summer Olympics in Rio de Janeiro, Brazil, took place at the Maria Lenk Aquatics Center from 14 to 16 August.

Eight teams competed, each consisting of eight swimmers (from a total team of nine swimmers). There was a single round of competition. Each team presents two routines: a technical routine and a free routine. The technical routine consists of twelve required elements, which must be completed in order and within a time of between 2 minutes 35 seconds and 3 minutes 5 seconds. The free routine has no restrictions other than time; this routine must last between 3 minutes 45 seconds and 4 minutes 15 seconds.

For each routine, the team is judged by two panels of five judges each. One panel is the technical jury, the other is the artistic jury. Each judge gives marks of between 0 and 10. The highest and lowest score from each panel are dropped, leaving a total of six scores which are then summed to give the routine's score. The scores of the two routines are then added to give a final score for the team.

The medals were presented by Stefan Holm, Nicole Hoevertsz and Alexander Zhukov, IOC members from Sweden, Aruba and Russia respectively and by Qiuping Zhang, Margo Mountjoy and Vladimir Salnikov, Bureau Members of FINA.

Schedule 
All times are UTC−03:00

Results

References

2016
2016 in women's sport
Women's events at the 2016 Summer Olympics